Eliot House is one of twelve undergraduate residential Houses at Harvard University. It is one of the seven original houses at the college. Opened in 1931, the house was named after Charles William Eliot, who served as president of the university for forty years (1869–1909).

Traditions

Before Harvard opted to use a lottery system to assign residences to upperclassmen (beginning with the class of 1999), Eliot was known as a 'prep' house, providing accommodation to the university's social elite, and being known as "more Harvard than Harvard". Describing Eliot House in the late 1950s and early 1960s, author Alston Chase wrote, "[A]lthough most Harvard houses in those days reflected the values of Boston Brahmin society ... Eliot was more extreme".

The motto 'Floreat Domus de Eliot' and 'Domus' are traditional chants and greetings, particularly on Housing Day, when freshman find out their housing assignments. Some traditions of Eliot House are the charity event An Evening with Champions, the Eliot Boat Club (an intramural crew team), formal dinners such as the Charles Eliot Dinner, a strong sense of house pride, and the annual Spring Fete.

Movie appearances

Eliot's prominent belltower is featured in many films, including Old School; Legally Blonde; Chasing Liberty; and Euro Trip, which features the tower at the end of the film, incorrectly identifying it as Oberlin College.  Eliot House is also featured prominently in Love Story and The Social Network.

Notable alumni
Notable former residents of the house include:

James Agee
Leonard Bernstein
Benazir Bhutto
Ben Bradlee
Archibald Cox
T.S. Eliot (as Charles Eliot Norton Chair of Poetry)
Patrick X. Gallagher
John Harbison
Rashida Jones
Eduardo Saverin
Ted Kaczynski
Jack Lemmon
Thomas Oliphant
George Plimpton 
Jay Rockefeller

References

External links

 Eliot House official site

Harvard University
Harvard Houses
University and college dormitories in the United States